The 1954–55 NBA season was the Bullets' 8th season in the NBA. The franchise ceased operations after playing 14 game with a 3-11 record on November 27, 1954. NBA's official record books for the 1954-55 season do not include the Bullets' games and team statistics, nor do they include the statistics of opposing players and teams in games played against the Bullets.

Baltimore would go without an NBA team until 1963, when the Chicago Zephyrs moved to Baltimore and became the second incarnation of the Baltimore Bullets.

Draft picks

Regular season

Game log

References

Baltimore Bullets (1944–1954) seasons
Baltimore